Came Out of the Grave is an album by the band Balzac.

Track listing
"The Grave - Dreizen"
"Zetsubou-No-Ano-Basyo-E"
"Season of the Dead"
"Inside My Eyes"
"Shi-Wo-Yubi-Sasu"
"The Pain Is All Around"
"Came Out of the Grave"
"Beyond Evil 308"
"Art of Dying"
"The World Without End, The Pain Is Not Around" (reprise)
"I'm Losing You"
"Beware of Darkness" (2004 version)
"I Know"

Credits
 Hirosuke - vocals
 Atsushi - guitar
 Akio - bass guitar
 Takayuki - drums

Balzac (band) albums
2004 albums